The Pentecostal/Charismatic Churches of North America (PCCNA) is an interdenominational fellowship of Pentecostal and charismatic churches and denominations in North America, existing for the purpose of promoting cooperation and understanding. It is a successor to the Pentecostal Fellowship of North America (PFNA). PCCNA headquarters are in Los Angeles, California.

History

Pentecostal Fellowship of North America
The Pentecostal Fellowship of North America was formed by eight Pentecostal denominations in 1948 at Des Moines, Iowa. Before the Des Moines meeting, a rally was held in Washington, D.C., and plans for a constitution were formulated. Two of the leading figures of the Washington meeting were Bishop Joseph A. Synan and Oral Roberts.

The following were charter members of the PFNA:
Assemblies of God USA
Church of God (Cleveland)
International Church of the Foursquare Gospel
International Pentecostal Holiness Church
Open Bible Standard Churches

Racial reconciliation and inclusion of charismatics
The Pentecostal/Charismatic Churches of North America was formed as part of a unification of charismatic and Pentecostal bodies and a movement toward racial reconciliation. Whereas the PFNA was formed to help bridge doctrinal divisions, the PCCNA set a broader goal of also the racial and cultural gaps. At a meeting in 1994 in Memphis, Tennessee, the Pentecostal Fellowship of North America was dissolved, and the Pentecostal/Charismatic Churches of North America was formed.

We are gathered here in Memphis, Tennessee, to return to our roots and to recapture the initiative of the Spirit. This will be a time of repentance for the sins of the past. This will be a time of forgiveness as we rely upon the wonderful grace of our loving Heavenly Father and mirror that grace in our relationships with one another. The time has come for reconciliation! The time has come to recapture our heritage! We gather here as the children of God and heirs of the twentieth century Pentecostal/charismatic renewal of the church. Our Father has called us to unity. - from an address of Bishop B. E. Underwood, Chairman of the PFNA, October, 1994

PURPOSES
To relate to one another as members of the body of Christ.
To demonstrate the essential unity of Spirit-filled believers in answer to the prayer of Jesus in John 17:21, “That they all may be one.”
To foster the evangelization of the world through the preaching of the gospel, with signs and wonders and the demonstration of the gifts of the Holy Spirit, by presenting Jesus Christ as the only Savior, Baptizer in the Holy Spirit, Healer, and Coming King. (Mark 16:10-20)
To promote and encourage the Pentecostal/Charismatic revival and renewal in North America and throughout the world.
To serve as a forum of spiritual unity, dialogue, and fellowship for all Pentecostal and Charismatic believers in North America, crossing all cultural and racial lines based on mutual equality, love, respect, and sound doctrine. (Acts 2:42)
To preserve mutual love and respect for each member group, maintaining “the unity of the Spirit in the bond of peace.” (Ephesians 4:1)

Members
With 32 churches as members, the PCCNA merge more than 16.7 million persons.

List of members
Apostolic Church of Pentecost of Canada
Assemblies of God USA
Association of Vineyard Churches
Calvary Ministries, Inc., International
Canadian Assemblies of God
Church of God (Cleveland, Tennessee)
Church of God in Christ
Church of God of the Apostolic Faith
Church of God Mountain Assembly
Church of God of Prophecy
Congregational Holiness Church
Elim Fellowship
Foursquare Church
Full Gospel Fellowship
Hilo Pentecostal Church
Independent Assemblies of God International
Independent Assemblies of God International (Canada)
India Pentecostal Church Florida
International Center for Spiritual Renewal
International Fellowship of Christian Assemblies
International Pentecostal Church of Christ
International Pentecostal Holiness Church
National Hispanic Christian Leadership Conference
Open Bible Churches
Open Bible Faith Fellowship
Pentecostal Assemblies of Canada
Pentecostal Assemblies of Newfoundland
Pentecostal Church of God
Pentecostal Free Will Baptist Church
Pentecostal Holiness Church of Canada
United Evangelical Churches
United Holy Church of America
Rehoboth Pentecostal church of Delaware Valley - An Indian Malayalee Pentecostal Church

See also

Pentecostal World Conference

References

External links
Official website of the PCCNA
Pentecostal - Charismatic Theological Enquiry International
The Memphis Miracle, by B. E. Underwood

Pentecostal denominations
Charismatic and Pentecostal organizations